The Rovers Football Club was an Australian rules football club that competed in the Western Australian Football Association (WAFA) from 1885 to 1899. The club won the premiership in 1885 and 1891.

History
Rovers began as a rugby union club in 1882 however made the switch to Australian rules football along with other West Australian clubs in 1885.

Rovers were one of four teams that formed the WAFA in 1885 and were invited to compete in the inaugural competition: the others were Fremantle, High School and Victorians.

The High School team dropped out two rounds into the season; the remaining teams played a six round season, with Rovers winning three and drawing two of its games to become the inaugural premiers of the WAFA.

After several competitive seasons, Rovers  won the premiership in 1891. The establishment of electorate football was the beginning of the end, as the club finished second last in 1892 and 1898, and won four wooden spoons between 1893 and 1897, including a winless 1893.

After losing the first eight games of 1899, Rovers dropped out of the competition and folded, replaced by First Rate Junior Association side Perth; many players transferred to the new club.

See also
Wikipedia listing of Rovers Football Club players

References

Former West Australian Football League clubs
Australian rules football clubs in Western Australia
1885 establishments in Australia
1899 disestablishments in Australia
Australian rules football clubs established in 1885
Australian rules football clubs disestablished in 1899